Hon. William Moore (11 December 1743 – 21 November 1810) was an Irish politician. He sat in the House of Commons of Ireland from 1765 to 1776 as a Member of Parliament (MP) for the borough of Clogher in County Tyrone, Clonmel in County Tipperary from 1781 to 1792, and for St Johnstown in County Longford from 1798 until his resignation in January 1800 by the procedural device of accepting the office of Escheator of Munster.

He was the third son of Stephen Moore, 1st Viscount Mount Cashell, by his second wife, and younger half-brother of Stephen Moore, 1st Earl Mount Cashell.

References 

1743 births
1810 deaths
Irish MPs 1761–1768
Irish MPs 1769–1776
Members of the Parliament of Ireland (pre-1801) for County Tyrone constituencies
Irish MPs 1776–1783
Irish MPs 1783–1790
Irish MPs 1790–1797
Members of the Parliament of Ireland (pre-1801) for County Tipperary constituencies
Irish MPs 1798–1800
Members of the Parliament of Ireland (pre-1801) for County Longford constituencies
Younger sons of viscounts